is a professional Japanese baseball player.

External links

1974 births
Living people
People from Chiba (city)
Aoyama Gakuin University alumni
Japanese baseball players
Nippon Professional Baseball pitchers
Hiroshima Toyo Carp players
Nippon Professional Baseball Rookie of the Year Award winners
Japanese baseball coaches
Nippon Professional Baseball coaches
Baseball people from Chiba Prefecture